Athens Independent School District is a public school district based in Athens, Texas, United States. The district serves central Henderson County, and small portions of southern Van Zandt and northern Anderson counties. As of November 2020, it served three thousand students.

History
In 2018, the district's board of directors decided to move to a four day week, as a means of attracting staff when they did not have the budgets to pay teachers what other districts could.

The four day week became effective in fall 2019. This was initially a provisional move for a three year period, but the district decided to make it the standard schedule in 2022. Circa 2022 various groups expressed support for a four day week in polling that was conducted.

Academics
As of 2011, the school district was rated "academically acceptable" by the Texas Education Agency, which was the same level they had been at since the ratings began in 2004.    Forty-nine percent of districts in Texas in 2011 received the same rating.

Schools
The district has five current schools:
Athens High School (Grades 9-12)
Athens Middle School (Grades 6-8)
Central Elementary (Grades HeadStart-5)
Bel-Air Elementary (Grades HeadStart-5)
South Athens Elementary (Grades HeadStart-5)

Former schools
While the schools were still segregated, Black students attended Blackshear High School, which was accredited in 1924. The school was subsequently renamed in honor of R.C. Fisher, who died suddenly at 44. The school closed in 1966. In August 2021, the district broke ground on a memorial to honor the students who attended Athens schools during the era of segregation. Bridges Center, which offered alternative instruction to high school students, closed in 2015.

See also

List of school districts in Texas
List of high schools in Texas

References

External links
 

School districts in Henderson County, Texas
School districts in Van Zandt County, Texas
School districts in Anderson County, Texas